Ergan (formerly Oğulcuk) is a village in the Erzincan District, Erzincan Province, Turkey. The village is populated by Kurds of the Aşuran, Demenan and Keçelan tribe and had a population of 211 in 2021. The hamlet of Gelinsi is attached to the village.

References 

Villages in Erzincan District
Kurdish settlements in Erzincan Province